Great Mills may refer to:
 Great Mills (DIY), a large DIY chain in the United Kingdom bought by Focus in 2000
 Great Mills, Maryland, an unincorporated community in St. Mary's County, Maryland, United States
 Great Mills High School, a comprehensive public high school in Great Mills, Maryland

See also 
 Great Mill (disambiguation)